William Hart Knickerbocker (December 29, 1911 – September 8, 1963) was an American shortstop in Major League Baseball for the Cleveland Indians (1933–36), St. Louis Browns (1937), New York Yankees (1938–40), Chicago White Sox (1941) and Philadelphia Athletics (1942).

Born in Los Angeles, Knickerbocker appeared in 46 games for the 1938 Yankees and only six games for the 1939 Bombers.  Both clubs won the World Series, but Knickerbocker never appeared in a fall classic contest.

His best season was in 1934 when he finished 19th in voting for the American League MVP Award for playing in 146 games and having 593 at bats, 82 runs, 188 hits, 32 doubles, 5 triples, 4 home runs, 67 RBI, 6 stolen bases, 25 walks, a .317 batting average, .347 on-base percentage, .408 slugging percentage, 242 total bases and 12 sacrifice hits.

In 10 seasons he played in 907 games and had 3,418 at bats, 423 runs, 943 hits, 198 doubles, 27 triples, 28 home runs, 368 RBI, 25 stolen bases, 244 walks, a .276 batting average, .326 on-base percentage, .374 slugging percentage, 1,279 total bases and 82 sacrifice hits.

He died in Sebastopol, California, at the age of 51.

References

1911 births
1963 deaths
Major League Baseball shortstops
Cleveland Indians players
St. Louis Browns players
New York Yankees players
Chicago White Sox players
Philadelphia Athletics players
Baseball players from Los Angeles